The Tishrin Dam offensive, or Southern Kobanî offensive, was a military operation in the northeastern Aleppo Governorate during the Syrian Civil War, conducted by the Syrian Democratic Forces (SDF) to capture the strategic Tishrin Dam and the southern countryside of the self-declared Kobanî Canton from the Islamic State of Iraq and the Levant (ISIL). The Combined Joint Task Force – Operation Inherent Resolve supported the SDF offensive with over 26 airstrikes.

Background

The offensive 

On 23 December, the joint command of the Syrian Democratic Forces officially launched the offensive, with the goal to "clear all areas in southern Kobanî Canton that have been occupied by elements of the terrorist group known as Daesh (ISIS)".

On 24 December, the SDF captured the villages of Sahrij, Al Jabal, Abaydad, Al Mansia, Miruha, Sajjadi, Dandoshan, Birdan and over fifteen farmlands south of the town of Sarrin, which was captured by the YPG and Free Syrian Army earlier in the same year, during the Battle of Sarrin. 14 ISIL members and 2 SDF fighters were killed during the battles.

On 25 December, the alliance of Kurdish, Arab and Assyrian militias seized the villages of Bojakh, Hafyan, Munsiye, Sofayte, Saqit, Dahr Al–Faraj and the surrounding farms from ISIL. During a nighttime raid, 12 ISIL members were killed. At that point, the SDF had managed to capture 16 km along the east bank of the Euphrates.

On 26 December, the Syrian Democratic Forces captured the Tishrin Dam and the villages of Bir Shumal, Bir Bagar, Abdilkiye, Tal Banat, Khishkhash, Al-Wesi and Miwelih. The SDF managed to kill five ISIL fighters and captured another eight alive. A total of 50 villages were seized from ISIL during the first four days of the offensive.

On 27 December, the SDF advanced on the western bank of the Euphrates. They captured the towns of Tishrin and Sakaniya. At least 15 members of ISIL were killed during the operation. On the same day ISIL executed four young men in Manbij who were accused of being members of the SDF.

On 30 December, the general command of the Syrian Democratic Forces declared the end of the operation to liberate the southern areas of the Kobanî Canton. The SDF captured over 100 villages and hamlets, the Tishrin Dam, an area of ~640 km², and killed 219 ISIL fighters, according to a balance sheet released by the SDF. An additional 100 ISIL fighters were killed by Coalition airstrikes during the offensive. Seven SDF members and two members of the police force Asayish died during the operation.

See also

November 2015 Sinjar offensive
Battle of al-Hasakah (June–August 2015)
Al-Hawl offensive
Al-Shaddadi offensive (2016)
Manbij offensive (2016)
Battle of Tabqa (2017)
List of wars and battles involving ISIL

References

External links
The YPG’s Next Move: A Two Front War for the Manbij Pocket

Military operations of the Syrian civil war in 2015
Military operations of the Syrian civil war involving the Islamic State of Iraq and the Levant
Aleppo Governorate in the Syrian civil war
Military operations of the Syrian civil war involving the Syrian Democratic Forces
Military operations of the Syrian civil war involving the People's Protection Units
Ayn al-Arab District
Manbij District